The 2015 Savannah State Tigers football team represented Savannah State University in the 2015 NCAA Division I FCS football season. The Tigers were members of the Mid-Eastern Athletic Conference (MEAC). This was their third season under the guidance of head coach Earnest Wilson and the Tigers played their home games at Ted Wright Stadium. They finished the season 1–9, 1–7 in MEAC play to finish in a tie for eighth place.

On February 17, head coach Earnest Wilson resigned to become the head coach at Elizabeth City State. He finished at Savannah State with a three-year record of 2–32.

Coaches and support staff

Schedule

References

Savannah State
Savannah State Tigers football seasons
Savannah State Tigers football